S. Pakkirisamy Pillai was an Indian politician and former Member of the Legislative Assembly of Tamil Nadu. He was elected to the Tamil Nadu legislative assembly from Perambur constituency as a Socialist Party candidate in 1952 election, and as an Independent candidate in 1957 election.

References 

Members of the Tamil Nadu Legislative Assembly
Tamil Nadu politicians